Ghajar (or ) is an Alawite-Arab village on the Hasbani River, on the border between Lebanon and the Israeli-occupied portion of Syria's Golan Heights.

History

Early history
Control over Ghajar has changed hands many times. Three hundred years ago, the village was known as Taranjeh. It was renamed Ghajar under the rule of the Ottoman Empire, when the land was allegedly seized from the "villagers" by Kurds and forcibly sold. According to "local" legend, the Kurdish governor of Ghajar tried to ride his horse onto the tomb of a local holy man, Sheikh al-Arba'in. The horse refused and the following day a fire broke out, destroying the governor's shield and sword. The Kurds fled and quickly sold it back.

Modern era

In 1932, the residents of Ghajar, predominantly Alawites, were given the option of choosing their nationality and overwhelmingly chose to be a part of Syria, which has a sizable Alawite minority.  Prior to the 1967 Arab–Israeli War, Ghajar was considered part of Syria and its residents were counted in the 1960 Syrian census. When Israel occupied the Golan Heights after capturing it from Syria in 1967, Ghajar remained a no-man's land for two and a half months. The Alawi villagers petitioned the Golan's Israeli governor to be attached to the occupied territory, as part of the Israeli-occupied Golan Heights, rather than Lebanon, because they considered themselves to be Syrians, like the majority of the native residents of the Golan at that time. Israel agreed to include Ghajar in its occupied territory of the Syrian Golan Heights.

In 1981, most Alawi villagers were pressured by authorities into Israeli citizenship under the Golan Heights Law which annexed the occupied Syrian territory to Israel, but the unilateral annexation was not recognized by the international community. After Operation Litani in 1978, Israel turned over its positions inside Lebanon to the South Lebanon Army and inaugurated its Good Fence policy. The United Nations Interim Force in Lebanon (UNIFIL) was created after the incursion, following the adoption of Security Council Resolution 425 in March 1978 to confirm Israeli withdrawal from Southern Lebanon, restore international peace and security, and help the government of Lebanon restore its effective authority in the area. Ghajar expanded northward into Lebanese territory, subsuming the Wazzani settlement north of the border.

In 1982, Israel invaded Lebanon. In 2000, following the campaign promise and election of Ehud Barak as Prime Minister, Israel withdrew their troops from Lebanon. In an attempt to demarcate permanent borders between Israel and Lebanon, the United Nations drew up what became known as the Blue Line. Due to Ghajar's location, wedged between Lebanon and the Israeli-occupied Golan Heights, the northern half of the village came under Lebanese control and the southern part remained under Israeli occupation. 

Despite the Israeli withdrawal from Lebanon, tension mounted as Hezbollah made attempts to kidnap Israeli soldiers in the Ghajar area. In 2005, Hezbollah launched a missile on Ghajar and infiltrated it, but withdrew after being repelled by the Israelis. Following another attack in July 2006, Israel invaded southern Lebanon and re-occupied the northern half of Ghajar during the 2006 Lebanon War. Following a month of intense fighting, UNSC Resolution 1701 was unanimously approved to resolve the conflict, and it was accepted by combatants on both sides.  Among other things, the resolution demanded the full cessation of hostilities, the withdrawal of Israeli forces, the disarming of Hezbollah, the deployment of Lebanese and UNIFIL soldiers, and the establishment of full control by the government of Lebanon.

The Blue Line fixation

In April 2009, the Lebanese paper Daily Star reported the IDF had agreed to withdraw from northern Ghajar at a meeting at Ras al-Naqoura. On 13 May, the government of Israel suspended talks to await the outcome of the Lebanese Parliamentary elections, fearing a Hezbollah victory. In the wake of reports in December 2009 of a possible splitting of the village, 2,200 Ghajar residents took to the streets in protest.

On November 2010, Israeli Prime Minister Benjamin Netanyahu informed the UN Secretary General of Israeli intentions to unilaterally withdraw from Ghajar, after failing to come to an agreement with Lebanon  and place security matters into the hands of UNIFIL.
On 17 November 2010, Security Cabinet of Israel voted in favor of withdrawal from northern half of Ghajar.

As the Syrian Civil War erupted, Israel halted redeployment along the border. Moreover, residents of Ghajar object to division of the village.

Citizenship

Residents on both sides of the village have Israeli citizenship; those in the northern half often hold passports from both Lebanon and Israel.  They work and travel freely within Israel, but those living on the Lebanese side have difficulties receiving services from Israel. There was an Israel Defense Forces checkpoint at the entrance to the village, and a fence surrounding the entire village, but no fence or barrier dividing the two sides of the village. The checkpoint at the entrance to the village was removed in September 2022 after the Local Council constructed a border fence separating the entire village from Lebanon.

UNIFIL observers
The UN has physically marked the recognized border and Israeli soldiers remain on the Lebanese side of Ghajar despite the decision of the Israeli cabinet on 3 December 2006, to hand it over to UNIFIL.  Israel says that the Lebanese army rejected a UN-brokered proposal in which the Lebanese Army would protect the vicinity north of the village, while UNIFIL would be deployed in the village itself; this type of arrangement would be unique for UNIFIL in populated areas.  A perimeter fence has been built along the northern edge of the village in Lebanese territory up to 800 meters north of the Blue Line. UNIFIL military observers patrol the area continuously.

In its October 2007 report on the implementation of the resolution, the United Nations issued a report stating that discussions on the duration of temporary security arrangements for northern Ghajar remained deadlocked. Israel remains in control north of the Blue Line and the small adjacent area inside Lebanese territory, although it does not maintain a permanent military presence there. The Lebanese Armed Forces patrol the road outside the perimeter fence. The report notes "so long as the Israel Defense Forces remain in northern Ghajar, Israel will not have completed its withdrawal from southern Lebanon in accordance with its obligations under resolution 1701 (2006)." It further notes: "Failure to make progress on this issue could become a source of tension and carry the potential for incidents in the future."

Problematic border demarcation
The reliability of the Blue Line in the area of the Ghajar has been questioned, based on cartographic and historical points of view. According to an article in Haaretz newspaper, there has never been an agreement over the exact location of the boundary in Ghajar and its vicinity. Maps produced prior to 1967 have been inconsistent, placing the village occasionally in Syria, at different times in Lebanon and less frequently divided between the two states. Ghajar, when under full Syrian control before the 1967 war, extended to include both sections of the village that were divided by the Blue Line in 2000—both the southern section that was annexed by Israel and the northern part that is located north of the Blue Line.

According to Dr. Asher Kaufman, a researcher from the University of Notre Dame, "This is clearly seen in reports of and sketches made by the US Embassy in Beirut that tried to decipher the problems of sovereignty in the tri-border region during the 'water wars' in the early 1960s between Israel and its Arab neighbors." According to Kaufman, the village has been divided by the Blue Line into two 'neighborhoods' "that in 2000 were mistakenly thought to be two different villages: Ghajar in the south and al-Wazzani in the north. The village of al-Wazzani, the supposedly northern village that lies within Lebanon, has never really existed. There is a small community called al-Wazzani, better known as ‘Arab al-Luweiza', but it is located west of the Hasbani river across from Ghajar".

In January 2015, Israel attacked a joint Hezbollah-Iranian military convoy on the Syrian controlled side of the Golan Heights, killing an Iranian commander and six Hezbollah operatives. When Hezbollah retaliated, Ghajar suffered attacks.

Economy
Most residents of Ghajar work outside the village, many of them in Kiryat Shmona. In 2021, the village began to organize local tours and home hospitality, catering to small groups. In 2022, local officials reported 4000 visitors per day.

Cuisine
Culinary specialties of Ghajar include a dish called mitabla, made of grains of wheat and corn cooked in milk, and bisara, a stew of bulgur, chickpeas and fried onions thickened with flour. Bisara is usually served with a sauce of garlic and lemon.

References

Bibliography

 (pp.87, 115) 
 (pp. 344–345)

(p. 21)
 (pp. 342, 353 (the bridge) 2nd appendix, p. 136 (the place))

External links
Survey of Western Palestine, map 2:  IAA, Wikimedia commons

Disputed territories in Asia
Divided cities
Towns in Quneitra Governorate
Populated places in the Golan Heights
Populated places in Nabatieh Governorate
Local councils in Northern District (Israel)
Alawite communities in Syria
18th-century establishments in Ottoman Syria